U-107 may refer to one of the following German submarines:

 , a Type U 93 submarine launched in 1917 and that served in World War I until surrendered on 20 November 1918; broken up at Swansea in 1922
 During the First World War, Germany also had this submarine with a similar name:
 , a Type UB III submarine launched in 1917 and sunk between 28 July – 4 August 1918
 , a Type IXB submarine that served in World War II until sunk on 18 August 1944

Submarines of Germany